Uzor Arukwe (born August 6, 1983) is a Nigerian actor from Abia State known for his role as Inspector Sam in a 2017 movie titled Sergeant Tutu.

Career 
Arukwe made his Nollywood debut in 2014 in the movie Unspoken Truth but however gained recognition for his role in Sergeant Tutu. His role as a private investigator in the 2019 movie, Code Wilo also earned him more recognition. He received 2 nominations for ‘Best Actor in Comedy or Movie’ in the 2020 African Magic Viewers' Choice Award for his roles in Smash and Size 12 respectively.

Filmography

Films

TV Shows

Awards and nominations

References

External links 
 

Nigerian male film actors
Living people
21st-century Nigerian male actors
Nigerian male television actors
1983 births
Actors from Abia State
Igbo actors